Andrew King (March 20, 1812 – November 18, 1895) was a member of the United States House of Representatives representing Missouri in the mid- to late 19th century. He was a member of the Democratic Party.

Career
A Democrat, King notably was the first congressperson to propose a nationwide ban on interracial marriage in the United States, which he did in 1871. King proposed an amendment to the US constitution to ban interracial marriage because he feared that the Fourteenth Amendment, ratified in 1868 to give equal civil rights to the emancipated ex-slaves (the Freedmen) as part of the process of Reconstruction, would render laws against interracial marriage unconstitutional.

External links

 

1812 births
1895 deaths
Democratic Party members of the United States House of Representatives from Missouri
19th-century American politicians